Miss Malaysia 1970, the 5th edition of the Miss Universe Malaysia, was held on 29 May 1970 at Fortuna Hotel, Bukit Bintang, Kuala Lumpur. Josephine Lena Wong of Perak was crowned by the outgoing titleholder, Rosemary Wan of Selangor at the end of the event.

Results

Delegates 

  – Malinda Khor
  – Mimi Abu Bakar
  – Rokiah Abdul Rahman
  – Vicky Chong
  – Florence Chan
  – Mary Ann Wong
  – Linda Soo Yoke Lin
  – Josephine Lena Wong
  – Carolyn Chin
  – Zowita Sheikh Mustapha
  – Salley Lee
  – Zabedah Yusof
  – Nancy Ang

References

External links 

 

1970 in Malaysia
1970 beauty pageants
2970
Beauty pageants in Malaysia
Women in Kuala Lumpur